Tha Sathon is a tambon (sub-district) of Phunphin District, Surat Thani province, southern Thailand.

Description
Tha Sathon is a hub for transportation of Surat Thani. It is the location of Surat Thani railway station, a provincial main station. Most tourists who travel by train from Hua Lamphong railway station in Bangkok tend to get off at this station to continue traveling to Ko Samui. Tha Sathon also has a few other railway stations. Tapi river, the main watercourse of the province, flows through the right side of the area and forms a line between Tha Sathon and Surat Thani city.

National famous politician Suthep Thaugsuban, began his politician career as a kamnan (sub-district chief) here in 1976 after graduating with a master's degree from the Middle Tennessee State University, USA.

Geography
Neighboring sub-districts are (from north, clockwise): Khao Hua Khwai in its district, Khun Thale and Wat Pradu in Amphoe Mueang Surat Thani, Tha Ruea in Amphoe Ban Na Doem, Tha Kham in its district.

Administration
Tha Sathon is administered by the Subdistrict Administrative Organization (SAO) Tha Sathon (องค์การบริหารส่วนตำบลท่าสะท้อน).

Tha Sathon also consists of six administrative villages (muban)

Population
Total population of 5,130 people in 1,200 households.

Local product
Krajood (Lepironia articulata) basketry

Notable people
Suthep  Thaugsuban (1949 – present) politician

References

External links
SAO Tha Sathon
Tambon of Surat Thani Province